Mohammed Aziz Lahbabi (born 25 December 1922, Fes, died on 23 August 1993, Rabat) was a Moroccan philosopher, novelist and poet writing in Arabic and French.

Career
Some of his books were translated into more than 30 languages. Lahbabi studied at the Sorbonne in Paris and received a doctorate of philosophy. He was professor of philosophy and dean of the faculty of letters at the Mohammed V University in Rabat. Characteristic of his philosophical writings is the union of Arab-Islamic and Western-humanistic ideas. He also wrote poetry, fiction, and non-fiction books  on economics, politics, and literature. Lahbabi was one of the founders of the Union of Arab Writers of the Maghreb and the review Afaq (Horizons). He was nominated for the 1987 Nobel Prize for Literature.

References

Books
Le Personnalisme Musulman (1964; "Muslim Personalism") 
Le Monde de Demain: Le Tiers-Monde accuse (1980; "The World of Tomorrow: The Third World accuses").
Espoir vagabond (1972) (novel)
Misères et lumières (1958) (poetry)

1922 births
People from Fez, Morocco
1993 deaths
University of Paris alumni
Academic staff of Mohammed V University
Moroccan writers in French
Moroccan philosophers
Moroccan essayists
Moroccan male writers
Male essayists
20th-century Moroccan poets
Moroccan novelists
Male novelists
Member of the Academy of the Kingdom of Morocco
20th-century Moroccan philosophers
20th-century novelists
20th-century essayists
Moroccan expatriates in France